Pryazovia (sometimes spelled Приозів‘я, Pryozivia; , Priazovye) or literally Cis-Azov region is usually used to refer to the geographic area of the north coast of the Sea of Azov. It is located in the northern part of the Azov-Kuban Lowland which surrounds the Sea of Azov for most of the stretch of coastline. In a more general sense it may mean the Azov Sea littoral. 

It consists of the southern part of Donetsk Oblast and Zaporizhzhia Oblast and the eastern part of Kherson Oblast. The western part of Rostov Oblast in Russia could also be included as a part of broader Northern Pryazovia. Following annexation and liquidation of Crimean Khanate, between 1783 and 1802 this land was part of Imperial Russian Novorossiya Governorate ("New Russia").

Ukraine's Greek minority population of 91,000 (in 2021) live mostly in the Pryazovia region.

During the 2022 Russian invasion of Ukraine, Pryazovia was occupied by Russian troops.

References

Historical regions in Ukraine
Historical regions in Russia
Sea of Azov